The Robbedale Formation is a geological formation dating to the Berriasian stage of the Early Cretaceous, about 142 million years ago. It is on the island of Bornholm, Denmark.

See also 
 List of fossiliferous stratigraphic units in Denmark

References

Further reading 
 E. B. Koppelhus and D. J. Batten. 1992. Megaspore assemblages from the Jurassic and lowermost Cretaceous of Bornholm, Denmark. DGU, Danmarks Geologiske Undersogelse, Serie A 32:1-81

Geologic formations of Denmark
Lower Cretaceous Series of Europe
Cretaceous Denmark
Berriasian Stage
Sandstone formations
Paleontology in Denmark
Formations